Goodenia stelligera, commonly referred to as spiked goodenia, is a species of flowering plant in the family Goodeniaceae and is endemic to near-coastal areas of eastern Australia. It is an erect herb with linear to lance-shaped leaves, sometimes with toothed edges, and racemes or thyrses of hairy yellow flowers.

Description

Taxonomy
Goodenia stelligera was first formally described in 1810 by botanist Robert Brown in Prodromus Florae Novae Hollandiae. The specific epithet (stelligera) means "star-bearing".

Distribution and habitat
Spiked goodenia grows in swamps on sandstone in near-coastal areas from south-eastern Queensland to near Braidwood in New South Wales.

References

stelligera
Flora of New South Wales
Flora of Queensland
Asterales of Australia
Plants described in 1810
Taxa named by Robert Brown (botanist, born 1773)